Doreen Tower is a high-rise skyscraper centered in the Gulshan-2 circle of Dhaka. It comprises the luxury hotel Four Points by Sheraton.

History
Rajdhani Unnayan Kartripakkha (RAJUK), the public authority responsible for overseeing urban development in Dhaka, approved the building plans in January 1998. Their approval came despite the fact that the building is twice the height allowed for the area, does not have the required setback, provides less than a third of the required parking, and lacks mandatory fire safety measures, including a fire-protected emergency staircase, fire fighting lift, and shelter space.

See also
 List of tallest buildings in Bangladesh
 List of tallest buildings in Dhaka

References

Buildings and structures in Dhaka
Hotels in Dhaka
Skyscraper hotels
Skyscraper office buildings in Bangladesh
Commercial buildings completed in 2012
2012 establishments in Bangladesh